Marco Bos (born 5 July 1979 in Roden) is a former Dutch cyclist.

Palmarès

2001
1st Mainfranken-Tour
3rd Grote Prijs Stad Geel
2002
1st Ster van Zwolle
1st stage 1 OZ Wielerweekend
2003
2nd Ster van Zwolle
3rd Dorpenomloop Rucphen
2005
3rd Ronde van Overijssel
3rd Profronde van Fryslan
2006
1st stage 3 Olympia's Tour
2007
1st Ronde van Overijssel
1st Ronde van Midden-Nederland
2009
2nd Ster van Zwolle
3rd Dorpenomloop Rucphen
3rd Ronde van Midden-Nederland

References

External links
 
 
 

1979 births
Living people
Dutch male cyclists
People from Noordenveld
Cyclists from Drenthe
21st-century Dutch people